Talwalkars Health Clubs Ltd, popularly known as Talwalkars, was India's largest chain of health clubs. At its peak it had 152 Health Clubs across 80 cities in India on a consolidated basis, with over  members. In 2020 bankruptcy proceedings were issued against the company for defaulting on loan payments.

History
Established in 1932, by late Mr. Vishnupant Talwalkar, his eldest son - Madhukar Talwalkar, further continued under the name "Talwalkars Gymnasium" in Bandra, Mumbai in 1962.
In March 2014, UK based David Lloyd Leisure group begun talks with the management of Talwalkars to acquire around 20 percent stake in the company. In June 2015, Talwalkars Better Value Fitness and David Lloyd announced their intention to create a joint venture (JV) establishing and managing leisure clubs in India.

References

Health clubs
Medical and health organisations based in India
Companies based in Mumbai
Health care companies established in 1932
1932 establishments in India
Companies listed on the National Stock Exchange of India
Companies listed on the Bombay Stock Exchange